People of Earth is an American science fiction sitcom television series created by David Jenkins about a support group for alien abductees, as well as the aliens who had abducted them. TBS ordered the pilot under the name The Group in May 2015, and announced a 10-episode order in January 2016. The series premiered on October 31, 2016, on TBS. On September 13, 2017, TBS renewed the series for a third season. However, on June 9, 2018, TBS reversed the renewal and canceled the series with season 3 already written.

Plot 
The series follows city journalist Ozzie Graham (Wyatt Cenac), who travels to Beacon, New York to write a piece on a support group called "StarCrossed", who are survivors of alien encounters. Although skeptical at first, Ozzie realizes the truth of the group's claims when he begins to recall similar experiences. Ozzie eventually quits his job and moves to Beacon to further investigate the town's strange occurrences, as well as resolve issues in his past related to his possible abduction.

As the series progresses, Ozzie gradually learns that his employer, Jonathan Walsh, is a reptilian in disguise. Jonathan, who has considered him a friend since he abducted the young Ozzie, explains that the Trinity Federation, an alliance among three races of extra-terrestrials (greys, whites, and reptilians), was sent many years ago to conquer Earth under reptilian leadership. However, in his time on Earth, Jonathan has developed sympathy for humans and wants to expose the truth about the invasion, so he hopes to persuade his alien coworkers and the humans he calls friends to help.

Cast

"StarCrossed" members 
A support group for "experiencers" – the term they prefer to abductees.
 Wyatt Cenac as Ozzie Graham, a reporter who travels to Beacon to investigate StarCrossed, then joins them upon realizing that he, too, is an experiencer
 Aaron Davis as young Ozzie
 Ana Gasteyer as Gina Morrison, a therapist
 Luka Jones as Gerry Johnson, a toll booth attendant who is passionate about aliens
 Brian Huskey as Richard Eugene Clancy Schultz, VP of a tech company that makes terminators for ethernet cables
 Alice Wetterlund as Kelly Grady, a temp receptionist at a funeral home
 Da'Vine Joy Randolph as Yvonne Watson, a postal worker
 Tracee Chimo as Chelsea Wheeler, a homemaker
 Daniel Stewart Sherman as Ennis Hart, a farmer
 Nancy Lenehan as Margaret Flood, a retiree
 Nasim Pedrad as Agent Alex Foster/Crystal, an FBI agent who was abducted as a baby
 Pedrad also plays Jasmine, Foster's twin sister

Aliens 
 Ken Hall as Jeff, a grey working on the alien spaceship (the "Sub-Ship") as part of the Trinity Federation
 Björn Gustafsson as Don, a white working on the Sub-Ship
 Drew Nelson as Kurt, a reptilian working on the Sub-Ship
 Nelson also voices the deer Ozzie hallucinates after his experience
 Michael Cassidy as Jonathan Walsh, a reptilian working on Earth as owner of the Glint media empire Ozzie works for
 Debra Lynne McCabe as Nancy, an android working as Jonathan's Earth assistant
 Victor Williams as Assessor, a reptilian and senior operative on Earth
 Peter Serafinowicz as Eric, a floating robotic cube from the Alpha Federation, who becomes the new boss on the Sub-Ship after a merger between the Alpha and Trinity Federations
 Ted Jefferies as Eric's guard
 Paul Lieberstein as Assessor, a reptilian assassin

Supporting characters 
 Oscar Nuñez as Father Doug, the priest in charge of the church where StarCrossed meets, who renounces his priesthood to pursue a relationship with Chelsea
 Amy Landecker as Debbie Schultz, Richard's ex-wife
 Michael Crane as John Wheeler, Chelsea's husband
 H. Jon Benjamin as Officer Lance Glimmer, a police officer working for the aliens
 Kevin Hanchard as Agent Jim Saunders, an FBI agent working for the aliens, and Foster's superior
 Eddson Morales as Brian
 Sam Malkin as Glenn, Richard's neighbor
 Douglas Nyback as Todd, Richard's boss

Episodes

Series overview

Season 1 (2016)

Season 2 (2017)

Production 
TBS first began developing the show in May 2015 and was going by The Group as its working title at the time. The final title "People Of Earth" is derived from classic sci-fi media: in the 1956 film "Earth vs the Flying Saucers," conquering aliens first address humans with the phrase "People of Earth. Attention!" 

The pilot was ordered to series with a 10-episode order by TBS in January 2016. It was directed by Greg Daniels and shot in Toronto, Ontario, Canada.

Reception 
People of Earth has received mostly positive reviews from television critics. The review aggregator website Rotten Tomatoes gives the first season an approval rating of 92%, based on 24 reviews, with an average rating of 7.25/10. The site's critical consensus reads: "People of Earth skillfully grounds its high-concept premise with a strong story, quirky humor, and sweetly relatable humanity." On Metacritic, the first season has a score of 72 out of 100, based on reviews from 20 critics, indicating "Generally favorable reviews".

Mike Hale of The New York Times gave it a positive review, writing: "People of Earth provides a funny line or detail just often enough to keep you watching." Maureen Ryan of Variety also praised the series, declaring "People of Earth may be slight and decidedly modest in its ambitions and execution, but it’s not a show that sets out to mock or belittle unconventional people." The Hollywood Reporter's Tim Goodman said People of Earth was "easily one of the best comedies on television."

References

External links 

 

2010s American comic science fiction television series
2010s American single-camera sitcoms
2016 American television series debuts
2017 American television series endings
English-language television shows
TBS (American TV channel) original programming
Television series by Conaco
Television series by Warner Horizon Television
Television shows filmed in Toronto
Alien abduction in television